This is a list of German football transfers in the winter transfer window 2019–20 by club. Only transfers of the Bundesliga, and 2. Bundesliga are included.

Bundesliga

Note: Flags indicate national team as has been defined under FIFA eligibility rules. Players may hold more than one non-FIFA nationality.

FC Bayern Munich

In:

Out:

Borussia Dortmund

In:

Out:

RB Leipzig

In:

Out:

Bayer 04 Leverkusen

In:

Out:

Borussia Mönchengladbach

In:

Out:

VfL Wolfsburg

In:

Out:

Eintracht Frankfurt

In:

Out:

Werder Bremen

In:

Out:

1899 Hoffenheim

In:

Out:

Fortuna Düsseldorf

In:

Out:

Hertha BSC

In:

Out:

1. FSV Mainz 05

In:

Out:

SC Freiburg

In:

Out:

FC Schalke 04

In:

Out:

FC Augsburg

In:

Out:

1. FC Köln

In:

Out:

SC Paderborn 07

In:

Out:

1. FC Union Berlin

In:

Out:

2. Bundesliga

VfB Stuttgart

In:

Out:

Hannover 96

In:

Out:

1. FC Nürnberg

In:

Out:

Hamburger SV

In:

Out:

1. FC Heidenheim

In:

Out:

Holstein Kiel

In:

Out:

Arminia Bielefeld

In:

Out:

Jahn Regensburg

In:

Out:

FC St. Pauli

In:

Out:

SV Darmstadt 98

In:

Out:

VfL Bochum

In:

Out:

Dynamo Dresden

In:

Out:

SpVgg Greuther Fürth

In:

Out:

Erzgebirge Aue

In:

Out:

SV Sandhausen

In:

Out:

VfL Osnabrürck

In:

Out:

Karlsruher SC

In:

Out:

Wehen Wiesbaden

In:

Out:

See also

 2019–20 Bundesliga
 2019–20 2. Bundesliga

References

External links
 Official site of the DFB 
 Kicker.de 
 Official site of the Bundesliga 
 Official site of the Bundesliga

Football transfers winter 2019–20
Trans
2019